Nootrukku Nooru is a 1971 Indian Tamil-language psychological thriller film directed and written by K. Balachander. It stars Jaishankar and Lakshmi, with Jayakumari, Vijaya Lalitha and Srividya in other pivotal roles. The story is about a college professor who is accused by three girls of sexual harassment, just before his marriage. It was released on 19 March 1971. The film was remade in Hindi as Imtihan in 1974.

Cast 
 Jaishankar as Prakash
 Lakshmi as Lakshmi
 Nagesh as Ramesh, college student leader & Lakshmi's brother
 Srividya as Manjula
 Vijaya Lalitha as Stella
 Jayakumari as Kousalya
 Gemini Ganesan as the college principal [Guest Appearance]
 R. S. Manohar as Manjula's father
 Srikanth as Police Investigator, Raja
 V. Gopalakrishnan as Robert
 V. S. Raghavan as David, Stella's father
 Y. Gee. Mahendra as Mahesh
 S. V. Sahasranamam as Lakshmi's father
 S. N. Lakshmi as Lakshmi's mother
 Sukumari as Manjula's mother
 Neelu as College Lecturer
 Jayanthi [Guest Appearance] as Vimala's mother

Production 
Although Jaishankar was previously known mainly for his action-oriented roles, Balachander saw potential in him for other roles and cast him in Nootrukku Nooru.

Soundtrack 
The music was composed by V. Kumar. The song "Naan Unnai" was remixed by S. Thaman in Kanna Laddu Thinna Aasaiya (2013).

Awards 
 1971 – Film Fans' Association Best Actor Award for Jaishankar

Remake 
Nootrukku Nooru was remade in Hindi as Imtihan in 1974.

References

External links 
 

1970s psychological thriller films
1970s Tamil-language films
1971 films
Films about educators
Films about sexual abuse
Films about sexual harassment
Films directed by K. Balachander
Films set in universities and colleges
Films with screenplays by K. Balachander
Indian black-and-white films
Tamil-language psychological thriller films
Tamil films remade in other languages